Chen Xiaohong may refer to:
 Xiaohong Chen, Chinese economist
 Chen Xiaohong (engineer), Chinese management science and engineering management specialist